Hudson José Coutinho (born 12 July 1972), known as Hudson Coutinho, is a Brazilian football assistant manager.

Career
Born in Florianópolis, Santa Catarina, Coutinho joined hometown's Figueirense in 2000, as a fitness coach, after a brief spell at Guarani de Palhoça. After nine years at the club – which included being manager for one match as an interim in 2007 – he moved to Náutico.

In July 2012, after another fitness coach experiences at Chapecoense, Marcílio Dias and Hercílio Luz, Coutinho was appointed manager of his previous club Guarani. He achieved promotion with the club in the state league, as champions, but was still sacked on 25 February of the following year.

In March 2013 Coutinho returned to his former side Figueirense, as an assistant manager. On 19 September 2015 he was named interim manager, replacing sacked René Simões.

On 21 September 2015 Coutinho was permanently appointed as manager of Figueira, after a request from the squad.

Honours
Guarani de Palhoça
Campeonato Catarinense Divisão Especial: 2012

References

External links
Soccerway profile

1972 births
Sportspeople from Florianópolis
Living people
Brazilian football managers
Campeonato Brasileiro Série A managers
Figueirense FC managers
Clube Náutico Marcílio Dias managers